2007–08 was the ninth season that Division 1 functioned as the third-level of ice hockey in Sweden, below the second-level HockeyAllsvenskan and the top-level Elitserien (now the SHL).

Format 
The 52 participating teams played the first half of the season in six groups divided geographically. The successful teams then moved into three new groups (the Allettan groups), while the remaining teams played in a continuation of their smaller existing groups. The teams with the worst records in these continuation groups were then forced to defend their places in Division 1 against challengers from Division 2 (see "relegation tournament" below) in a round-robin tournament called Kvalserien till Division 1. Meanwhile, the successful teams from the Allettan groups along with the group winners of the continuation groups played a playoff to determine who would have a chance to compete for promotion to the second-tier league HockeyAllsvenskan in Kvalserien till HockeyAllsvenskan.

First round

Division 1A

Division 1B

Division 1C

Division 1D

Division 1E

Division 1F

AllEttan

Northern Group (A/B)

Central Group (C/D)

Southern Group (E/F)

Qualification round

Division 1A

Division 1B

Division 1C

Division 1D

Division 1E

Division 1F

Playoffs

First round 
 Nacka HK - Lindlövens IF 2:0 (5:3, 5:2) 
 Kristianstads IK - Tranås AIF 0:2 (2:3 OT, 2:6)
 LN 91 - Clemensnäs HC 1:2 (4:7, 7:3, 2:3)

Second round 
 Tranås AIF - Örebro HK 0:2 (1:5, 1:8)
 Clemensnäs HC - Östersund/Brunflo IF 0:2 (2:7, 1:8)
 Nacka HK - Enköpings SK 0:2 (2:5, 2:12)

Final round 
 Örebro HK - Asplöven HC 1:2 (5:4, 1:4, 3:5)
 Östersund/Brunflo IF - Väsby IK 0:2 (3:4, 4:5)
 Enköpings SK - IF Troja-Ljungby 0:2 (3:4, 2:5)
 Valbo AIF - Mariestads BoIS 1:2 (4:3 OT, 0:3, 5:8)

Relegation

Division 1B

Division 1C

Division 1D

Division 1E

Division 1F

External links 
 Season on hockeyarchives.info

3
Swedish Division I seasons